Mohammad Saiful Islam Khan (born April 14, 1969, in Dhaka) is a former Bangladeshi cricketer who played in 7 ODIs from 1990 to 1997.
Originally from Mymensingh, Saiful played for the Bangladesh U-19 side in 1989.
He made his full ODI debut at Eden Garden  Calcutta on 31 December 1990. His best performance in ODI came at Sharjah against Sri Lanka in 1995. he took 4/36 to help Bangladesh bowl out their opposition for the first time in a full ODI. He also played in the Bangladesh side that won the ICC Trophy in 1997. But with the emergence of a group of talented medium pacers he soon lost his place in the national side.

References

External links
 http://www.thedailystar.net/magazine/2006/05/02/sports.htm

1969 births
Living people
Bangladesh One Day International cricketers
Bangladeshi cricketers
Dhaka Division cricketers
People from Mymensingh